is a professional Go player.

Miyazawa turned professional in 1966 and reached 9 dan in 1993. He currently resides in the Kanagawa Prefecture in Japan.

Titles & runners-up

References

1949 births
Japanese Go players
Living people